Events from the year 1583 in the Kingdom of Scotland.

Incumbents
Monarch – James VI

Events
 June – James VI regains his freedom following the Raid of Ruthven.
James VI signs a charter (dated 1582) creating the Tounis College, the modern-day University of Edinburgh.

Births
Elizabeth Woodford
Approximate date –
David Dickson, theologian (died 1663)
Alexander Henderson, theologian (died 1646)

Deaths
 26 May – Esmé Stewart, 1st Duke of Lennox (born 1542)
 13 December – Thomas Smeton, minister and academic (born 1536)
 December – James Balfour, Lord Pittendreich, lawyer (born )
Alexander Arbuthnot, minister, academic and poet (born 1538)
John Cockburn of Ormiston, Protestant laird

See also
 Timeline of Scottish history

References